John Ridge (c.1590–c.1637) was an English puritan minister, active in Ireland.

Life
He was born at Oxford about 1590. He matriculated at St John's College, Oxford, on 16 June 1610, at the age of twenty, and graduated B.A. on 23 May 1612, having already been ordained deacon by John Bridges, bishop of Oxford. A nonconformist, he went over to Ireland, where he was probably ordained presbyter by Robert Echlin, bishop of Down and Connor. On 7 July 1619 Echlin admitted him to the vicarage of Antrim, on the presentation of Arthur Chichester. He built up his church (founded 1596), and gained a reputation as a preacher. He has been described as a presbyterian, but Alexander Gordon writing in the Dictionary of National Biography disagrees.

About 1626 Hugh Campbell, a layman from Ayrshire, established a meeting on the last Friday of each month at his house in Oldstone, two miles from Antrim. Crowds of people attended, encouraged by James Glendinning, the vicar of Carnmoney. To counter Campbell Ridge began a meeting for preaching and conference on the first Friday of each month at Antrim, and called in the aid of Robert Blair, Robert Cunningham (d. 1637) of Holywood, co. Down, and James Hamilton. This was the origin of the Antrim meeting, an advisory body claiming no jurisdiction. According to Alexander Gordon, it was influential, and furnished the model of the Worcestershire agreement framed by Richard Baxter in 1652, and adopted in numerous English counties in place of the parliamentary presbyterianism; and through John Howe, a member of the Antrim meeting (1671-5) became the parent of the county unions formed among English dissenters after the passing of the Toleration Act 1688.

The fame of the meeting brought to Antrim, about 1628, a company of English separatists and an Arminian, John Freeman, but they were unsuccessful in making proselytes. Ridge was one of the five beneficed clergy who, at the primary visitation of Henry Leslie at Lisburn in July 1636, refused to subscribe to the new canons, which were to assimilate the doctrine and ceremonies of the Irish church to those of England. The private conference which followed went unrecorded; in the public disputation with Leslie at Belfast (on 11 August) Ridge took no part, but when called up for sentence on 12 August he admitted that Leslie had given the five non-subscribers a fair, though not a full, hearing. Leslie thought his scruples arose from a melancholy temperament. He condemned him to 'perpetual silence within his diocese.' Alexander Gordon asserts that there had been no actual presbyterianism in Ireland to this point, and the question of the form of church government had not been seriously raised, and that was Leslie's action, prompted by John Bramhall, that laid the foundation of a revolt against episcopal authority.

The silenced clergymen, with the exception of Edward Brice, retired to Scotland. They were received at Irvine, Ayrshire, by David Dickson (1583?-1663). Here Ridge is believed to have died in 1637, but there is no record of his death or burial.

Family
He was married, and left daughters, one of whom, Susannah (d. 19 April 1693), was married on 30 September 1643 to Samuel Heathcote of Derby, and had ten children; the descendants of her eldest son, Samuel, are numerous.

References

1590 births
1637 deaths
17th-century English Anglican priests
English Jacobean nonconforming clergy
Irish Presbyterian ministers